Lovedale is a village situated in the Nilgiri Hills in the state of Tamil Nadu in India. It is one of the highest places above mean sea level in the Nilgiris. Today, it is notable for tourism.

Nearest large population areas 

Ooty (5 km away). The Queen of Hills is located just 5 km away from Lovedale. 
Conoor (16 km)
Wellington
Nilambur

Population 

The permanent population is about 1,000-1,500 people.  The residents of The Lawrence School add another 1,000 people to this.

Establishments 

The Lawrence School is a residential school. Lovedale has a police station that serves Lovedale and the nearby villages. It also has a small post office and a bank (branch of SBI), both of which primarily serve The Lawrence School.

Educational institutions
 Lawrence School, Lovedale
 St. Antony's High School, Lovedale
 Nilgiris Matriulation higher Secondary school, Lovedale

Climate
Lovedale features a subtropical highland climate (Cwb) under Köppen climate classification. It, along with Ooty, are located in the highest part of the Nilgiri Hills. Due to its location in the Nilgiris, Lovedale gets rain from both the monsoons. The wet season runs from April to December and the dry season from January to March. There is a difference of 345 mm of precipitation between the driest and wettest months. Throughout the year, temperatures vary by 4.2 °C.

Minsara kanavu climax was shot in this area.

Transport 

By rail: The NMR (UNESCO World Heritage Site) passes through Lovedale. Lovedale is the second to last railway station on the route to Ooty from Mettupalayam, and is also the highest station on the entire route.
By road: Lovedale is situated just 5 km from Ooty and one can take a taxicab or bus from there. The bus is the cheapest way to get there, with tickets costing just Rs 5.

See also 
 Lovedale (South Africa)

References 

Tourist attractions in Nilgiris district
Villages in Nilgiris district